Charles Edward Ives (11 April 1907 – 24 October 1942) was a New Zealand footballer who represented New Zealand at international level.

Ives played two official A-international matches for the All Whites in 1933 against trans-Tasman neighbours Australia as part of a 13 match tour, the first a 4–6 loss on 17 June 1933, Ives being amongst the New Zealand goalscorers, followed by a 2–4 loss on 24 June.

Personal life
Ives worked as a hospital attendant. He served as a private in the 26th Battalion of the New Zealand Military Forces during the Second World War and was involved in the Second Battle of El Alamein in October 1942. Ives was mentioned in the battalion's war history for his conduct as a stretcher bearer on 23 October. He was killed in action the following day and is buried at El Alamein War Cemetery.

References

1907 births
1942 deaths
New Zealand association footballers
New Zealand international footballers
Association footballers not categorized by position
New Zealand military personnel killed in World War II